The Kerala Legislative Assembly, popularly known as the Kerala Niyamasabha, is the State Assembly of Kerala, one of the 28 states in India. The Assembly is formed by 140 elected representatives. Each elected member represents one of the 140 constituencies within the borders of Kerala and is referred to as Member of the Legislative Assembly (MLA). The present Kerala Legislative Assembly consists of 140 elected members.

History

In 1956, the State of Kerala was formed on linguistic basis, merging Cochin, Malabar, and Travancore regions, and the Kasaragod region of South Canara. The first assembly election in Kerala state was held in February–March 1957. The first Kerala Legislative Assembly was formed on 5 April 1957. The Assembly had 127 members including a nominated member.

The current delimitation committee of 2010 reaffirmed the total number of seats at 140.

Niyamasabha Complex

The State Assembly is known as Niyamasabha and is housed in New Legislature Complex. This 5 storied complex is one of the largest complexes in India. The Central Hall is described as most elegant and majestic hall with ornamental Teakwood-Rosewood panelling. The older Assembly was located within State Secretariat complex which was reconverted into Legislature museum, after commissioning new complex in 1998 May 22 (K. R. Narayanan).

15th Kerala Legislative Assembly

Speakers of the Kerala Legislative Assembly

Source:

Composition
The Assembly consists of 140 Members known as Members of Legislative Assembly- MLA representing each constituency.

The qualifications needed to become an MLA are almost similar to the eligibility criteria for an MP.  Besides being a citizen of India, the individual should not be less than 25 years of age. On a more fundamental note, a person, who is not a voter from any constituency of the state, is not eligible to become an MLA.

It's to be noted that an MLA is elected by the people of a particular constituency, and the MLA represents those electorates in the Legislative Assembly. MLAs enjoy the same position in the state as MPs on a national level.

Responsibilities of Legislators

The principal responsibility of an MLA is to represent the people's grievances and aspirations and take them up with the state government. An MLA has the power to utilise several legislative tools including 'calling attention motion' to raise issues concerning his/her constituency. It's also expected of the MLA to raise the issues with the relevant government agency and minister. As a legislator, his cardinal role will be to make optimum use of the Local Area Development (LAD) fund in a bid to develop his constituency.

Appointment of Speaker
The Speaker is the primary official of the Assembly. The Assembly elects the Speaker from among its own members. While the Speaker still represents his constituency, he remains an impartial chair of the Assembly and refrains from debating.

When a new assembly is formed, the political party/alliance which is invited by the Governor to form a government, nominates one among them as Pro-term Speaker. The Pro-Term speaker swears in front of Governor and opens the new assembly's first session.

He oversees swearing-in ceremony of all legislators at the assembly hall and then becomes the returning officer for the Speaker Election.

The Leader of the House, Chief Minister presents a motion for speaker election and nominates one among his party/alliance for Speaker position.

The Leader of Opposition supports the motion and nominates one among them as speaker position. The Pro-term speaker then asks whether anyone else wish to contest for speaker post. If any application received, it shall also be enlisted for election.

Based on motion, the pro-term speaker will order for an election and Legislative secretary will arrange an election at the floor of the assembly. The election will be closed affair with each member casting a secret vote on a ballot paper. The results will be counted by Legislative Secretary in front of representatives from both Ruling and Opposition parties.

Accordingly, the pro-term speaker announces the new speaker and both leaders of assembly escort the new speaker to Speaker Dias to take charge of the post.

A similar election is conducted to appoint Deputy Speaker who shall take the office in absence of the speaker.

Officials

The speaker is assisted by Legislative Secretariat. The head of Secretariat is Legislative Secretary. The Legislative secretary is the Executive chief of the Assembly and reports only to Speaker and house directly.

The Legislative secretary is supported by 2 Additional Secretaries, Joint Secretaries and Assistant Secretaries. There are under-secretaries for each committee topic and officers in charge.

The Chief Curator manages the entire house activities including housekeeping, maintenance and safety measures. The Chief Editor manages an editorial team to draft questions raised by public and legislators as well as manages answers notes, legislative records, executive orders and archival matters. The Chief Librarian manages the Central Library and Legislative Research cell of Niyamasabha.

Security

From days of the Monarchy Kerala Police were not allowed inside Niyamasabha as a matter of enforcing legislative independence. The Niyamasabha has its own security force called Watch and Ward, distinguished by its white uniforms who reports to the Hon'ble Speaker or the Secretary of the Assembly. Its headed by Chief Marshall who is in the rank of Superintendent of Police.

The Watch and ward control the security of entire Assembly area as well as nearby Legislative Hostel.

Committees

Statutory Committee

The Niyamasabha consists of following committees which are statutory in nature and cannot be disbanded, though the members do change.

1. Business Advisory Committee (BAC)

The BAC is the primary committee to decide the agendas to be listed in each session of the assembly. As a convention, the opposition leader will be the head of the committee with leaders of each parliamentary party subjected to a maximum of 8 members. Speaker of the house is a permanent invitee to this committee.
 
2. Committee on Environment

3. Committee on Estimates

4. Committee on Government Assurances

5. Committee on Local Fund Accounts

6. Committee on Official Language

7. Committee on Papers Laid on the Table

8. Committee on Petitions

9. Committee on Private Members' Bills and Resolutions

10. Committee on Privileges and Ethics

11. Committee on Public Accounts

12. Committee on Public Undertakings

13. Committee on Subordinate Legislation

14. Committee on the Welfare of Backward Class Communities

15. Committee on the Welfare of Fishermen and Allied Workers

16. Committee on the Welfare of Non-resident Keralites

17. Committee on the Welfare of Scheduled Castes and Scheduled Tribes

18. Committee on the Welfare of Senior Citizens

19. Committee on the Welfare of Women, Children and Physically Handicapped

20. Committee on the Welfare of Youth and Youth Affairs

21. House Committee

22. Library Advisory Committee

23. Rules Committee

Subject Committee

Apart from the statutory committee, the assembly has a subject committee for each Department of Government. Though they are not statutory in nature, its established by the house on regular basis to monitor and control executive decisions of each department when a specific bill intended to make into a legislation comes before assembly. Normally when a bill is presented and amendments or disputes arise, the bills are sent to a subject committee specifically formed such departmental activity.

As per Kerala Legislature Rules, the following committees are regularly established in the house.

1. Subject Committee  - I:- Departments of Agriculture, Animal Husbandry and Fisheries

2. Subject Committee  - II:- Land Revenue, Land usage, wetland protection, Endowments and Devaswom

3. Subject Committee  - III:- Water Resources, Irrigation projects and Dam safety

4. Subject Committee  - IV:- Industry and Minerals

5. Subject Committee  - V:- Public Works, Transport & Communications

6. Subject Committee  - VI:- Education

7. Subject Committee  - VII:- Power, Labor and Labor Welfare

8. Subject Committee  - VIII:- Economic Affairs

9. Subject Committee  - IX:- Local Administration, Rural Development and Housing

10. Subject Committee  - X:- Forest, Environment and Tourism

11. Subject Committee  - XI:-  Food, Civil Supplies and Co-operation

12. Subject Committee  - XII:- Health and Family Welfare

13. Subject Committee  - XIII:- Social Service

14. Subject Committee  - XIV:- Home and Security Affairs

Ad-Hoc Committee

Time-to-time, the assembly can form an ad-hoc committee for business as laid by a motion passed by the house.

See also
 Sree Moolam Popular Assembly
 2021 Kerala Legislative Assembly election
 2019 Kerala Legislative Assembly by-elections
 2016 Kerala Legislative Assembly election
 2011 Kerala Legislative Assembly election

References

 Legislators up to 2006
 http://klaproceedings.niyamasabha.org

Further reading

External links
 Kerala Lok Sabha Election 2019 Results Website

 niyamasabha.org
 Kerala Assembly Election 2016 Website
 Election Database
 klaproceedings.niyamasabha.org

 
State legislatures of India
1957 establishments in Kerala
Unicameral legislatures